Letete (Mi'kmaq for 'Fast Running Water') (formerly spelt L'Etete or Letite) is a Canadian unincorporated community in Charlotte County, New Brunswick. The primary route in and out of the village is either via Route 172 or the Letete to Deer Island Ferry which travels between the settlement and Deer Island.

History

Notable people

James N. Tucker, Jr. - Politician

See also
List of communities in New Brunswick

References

Communities in Charlotte County, New Brunswick